Eduard Gustav Ludwig Adolph Wach, known as Adolf Wach (11 September 1843 – 4 April 1926) was a German jurist, a professor in Königsberg, Rostock, Tübingen, Bonn and Leipzig.

Biography
Wach was born in Kulm, West Prussia, Kingdom of Prussia (Chełmno, Poland) to Adolph Leopold Wach (1804–1852), the town treasurer of Kulm, and Gustava Wach, née Suchland (?–1870). Wach passed his Abitur in 1861 at the gymnasium in Kulm and studied law at the Universities of Berlin, Heidelberg, Königsberg and Göttingen.

He received his doctorate in October 1865 and habilitated in Königsberg in 1868. From 1868 to 1869 he worked as Privatdozent of religious and Civil procedure law at the University of Königsberg. In 1869 Wach became ordinary Professor for Civil procedure and penal law at the University of Rostock, in 1871 he transferred to the University of Tübingen and in 1872 to Bonn. From 1875 to 1920 Wach was ordinary professor for penal law, penal and civil procedure law at the University of Leipzig. Here he was also elected Decan of the juridical faculty in 1878/79,  1885/86, 1890/91, 1894/95, 1900/01, 1908/09 and 1918/19. From 1902 to 1903 he was Rektor of the University of Leipzig.

Wach retired in 1920 and died in Leipzig on 4 April 1926. He was buried next to his wife in Gsteig, Switzerland, where he had owned a holiday chalet.

Family
Wach was married to Elisabeth (Lili) Mendelsohn (1845–1910), youngest daughter of Felix Mendelsohn. They had six children, their son Hugo Wach became Professor for architecture and ornamentation at the Technical University of Berlin. Felix Wach, father of Joachim Wach, became a jurist and Saxon public official. The Wach family preserved the heritage of Felix Mendelsohn in a collection of letters, furniture and objects of art.

Publications
De transferenda ad firmarium advocatione, ex VII potissimum cap. X. de jur. patr. (III, 38) explicata (phd, 1865)
 Die Geschichte des italienischen Arrestprozesses (habil., 1868)
 Handbuch des deutschen Civilprozessrechts, Leipzig 1885
 Die Beweislast nach dem bürgerlichen Gesetzbuch, Leipzig 1901
 Struktur des Strafprozesses, München 1914.

Awards 
 Royal Saxon Geheimrat
 Civil Order of Saxony
 Order of the Zähringer Lion
 House Order of the Wendish Crown
 Swedish Order of the Polar Star
 Order of the Crown (Romania)
 Honorary citizen of Wilderswil

References

1843 births
1926 deaths
People from Chełmno
People from West Prussia
Humboldt University of Berlin alumni
Heidelberg University alumni
University of Königsberg alumni
University of Göttingen alumni
Academic staff of the University of Königsberg
Academic staff of the University of Rostock
Academic staff of Leipzig University
Academic staff of the University of Tübingen
Academic staff of the University of Bonn
Mendelssohn family
Privy Councillor (Russian Empire)